WBCH-FM (100.1 FM) is a radio station licensed to Hastings, Michigan broadcasting a country music format.

Bronco Radio Network
WBCH is an affiliate of the Western Michigan University "Broncos Radio Network" and carries all of the Broncos football and men's hockey games.

References
Michiguide.com - WBCH-FM History

External links

BCH-FM
Country radio stations in the United States
Radio stations established in 1979
1979 establishments in Michigan